is a Japanese sailor. Her mother is Danish, and her father is Japanese. She won a silver medal in the 470 class at the 1996 Summer Olympics with Yumiko Shige.

References

External links
 
 
 

1967 births
Living people
Japanese female sailors (sport)
Japanese people of Danish descent
Olympic sailors of Japan
Olympic silver medalists for Japan
Olympic medalists in sailing
Sailors at the 1992 Summer Olympics – 470
Sailors at the 1996 Summer Olympics – 470
Sailors at the 2000 Summer Olympics – 470
Medalists at the 1996 Summer Olympics
Ferris University alumni
20th-century Japanese women